Leira is a small village in the municipality of Volda, in Møre og Romsdal county, Norway. It lies between the villages of Bjørke and Viddal, at the end of Hjørundfjorden.

There are about 15–20 residents in Leira, with most residents farming their land. Leira is fairly isolated, with only one road leading to it. The road continues along the fjord to Viddal where the road ends.

Prior to 2020, the village and surrounding area was part of the neighbouring municipality of Ørsta.

Name
The name is derived from the Norwegian language word leire which means 'clay'.

References

Volda
Villages in Møre og Romsdal